Jacques-Louis-François Delaistre de Tilly (2 February 1749, Vernon, Eure – 10 January 1822, Paris) became a general officer in the French army during the French Revolutionary Wars. He led a cavalry division in a number of battles during the Napoleonic Wars. His name is inscribed under the Arc de Triomphe.

Service 
29 November 1792 : Colonel of the 6th Regiment of Dragoons
21 April 1793 : General of Brigade
2 December 1793 : General of Division
23 December 1793 : Commanded troops at the Battle of Savenay
5 May 1801 : Commander in chief of the Armée de l'Ouest
11 October 1805 : Commanded the Cavalry Division of the VI Corps at the Battle of Haslach-Jungingen
14 October 1805 : Commanded the Cavalry Division of the VI Corps at the Battle of Elchingen
17 October 1806 : Commanded the Cavalry Division of the I Corps at the Battle of Schleiz
17 October 1806 : Commanded the Cavalry Division of the I Corps at the Battle of Halle
6 November 1806 : Commanded the Cavalry Division of the I Corps at the Battle of Lübeck
25 January 1807 : Commanded the Cavalry Division of the I Corps at the Battle of Mohrungen
21 June 1813 : Commanded the 2nd Cavalry Division of the Army of the South at the Battle of Vitoria

Decorations
25 March 1809 : Chevalier d'Empire
23 April 1812 : Baron d'Empire

Honours 
 TILLY is engraved on Column 4 of the Arc de Triomphe

Footnotes

References

Printed materials
Smith, Digby. The Napoleonic Wars Data Book. London: Greenhill, 1998. 
Glover, Michael. The Peninsular War 1807-1814. London: Penguin, 2001. 

1749 births
1822 deaths
People from Vernon, Eure
Republican military leaders of the War in the Vendée
French Republican military leaders of the French Revolutionary Wars
French commanders of the Napoleonic Wars
Names inscribed under the Arc de Triomphe